William Ray Price (born January 30, 1952) is a former judge of the Supreme Court of Missouri and its longest-serving Supreme Court member,  having served from April 7, 1992, when he was appointed to the Court by then-Governor John Ashcroft, until August 1, 2012, when he retired from the bench.  He was retained by a vote of the people of Missouri for twelve-year terms in 1994 and again in 2006.  He served two 2-year terms as Chief Justice of the Supreme Court of Missouri from July 1, 1999 to June 30, 2001 and from July 1, 2009 to June 30, 2011.  He graduated Phi Beta Kappa and Kappa Sigma from the University of Iowa, attended Yale Divinity School and received his law degree from Washington and Lee University School of Law in 1978.  He was in private practice in Kansas City from 1978 to 1992, where he served as a director of Truman Medical Center and president of the Kansas City Board of Police Commissioners. Since retiring from the bench, he has joined the law firm of Armstrong Teasdale LLP in its St. Louis office.

References

External links
 William Ray Price Jr. on the Missouri Supreme Court website

1952 births
Living people
20th-century American judges
20th-century American lawyers
21st-century American judges
Chief Justices of the Supreme Court of Missouri
Judges of the Supreme Court of Missouri
People from Fairfield, Iowa
University of Iowa alumni
Washington and Lee University School of Law alumni
Yale Divinity School alumni